The Bristol Type 603 is a car that was launched in 1976 by British manufacturer Bristol Cars to replace the 411. With the 603 – introduced along with the Zagato-built 412 – the Bristol car underwent its first major facelift since the introduction of the 406 in the late 1950s. The design was to last until the marque's (temporary?) demise in 2011. Bristol's chief designer Dudley Hobbs strived to make the car more spacious and aerodynamic, while also using flatter body panels that would be easier to hammer.

603
The classic three-box two-door saloon was replaced by a considerably more streamlined design with a much larger and more curved rear window. The manufacturer pointed out that the new car had more head, leg and shoulder room than any previous Bristol. The outdated style of door handle was updated.

The original 603 was offered in two versions, largely owing to the energy crisis which increased fuel prices so that affordability of fuel was no longer a certainty for those who could afford such expensive cars. The 603E has a 5,211 cc V8 petrol engine, whereas the 603S had a larger 5.9-litre unit, from Chrysler. Both retained the same transmission and suspension as the 411, but the cabin had become more luxurious with the provision of electrically adjustable seats and air conditioning.

603 S2
As the energy crisis eased, all Bristols received a standard 5.9-litre Chrysler unit that was to be used for all subsequent editions of the car. The headlamp clusters were also set in a new grille. This model is called the 603 S2.

Britannia and Brigand (603 S3)

The third series of 603, introduced in 1982 and continuing until 1994, saw Bristol adopt for the first time the names of the famous Bristol Aeroplane Company models for its cars. With this series of 603, there was a smaller radiator grille and more modern rear vision mirrors. The headlamps were the rectangular units from the Volkswagen Scirocco II. The tail-lights, borrowed from the Bedford CF2 van, were also mounted directly vertically, whereas on previous versions of the 603 the reversing lights were separate from the rear turn indicators and brake lights.

The Bristol Britannia was the standard version, whilst the Bristol Brigand had a Rotomaster turbocharger added to the Chrysler V8 engine and a torque converter originally used on the 440 V8 to cope with the extra performance, which saw the Brigand capable of 150 mph (241 km/h). The Brigand could be distinguished from the Britannia by the bulge in the bonnet needed to accommodate the turbocharger, and also had alloy wheels as standard equipment.

There were a number of minor changes to the appearance of both models during their 12-year production run, especially at the front.

Blenheim (603 S4)

With the Blenheim, Bristol further refined the 603, in particular modernising the mechanicals of the car through the introduction of multi-port fuel injection, which improved both performance and fuel consumption. Turbocharging was no longer available, but the Blenheim Series 1 still had the same level of performance as the Brigand.

There was a significant change in frontal and rear-end styling with the introduction of the Blenheim. The headlights were paired and mounted considerably inboard from the extreme front of the car. The bonnet was also modified with the fitting of gas struts to hold it up when open for the first time, and featured a fully rectangular hinge for the first time in Bristol's history.

Since that time the Blenheim has gone through two additional series, the Bristol Blenheim Series 2, made from January 1998 to the end of 1999, featured for the first time a four-speed overdrive automatic transmission, which significantly improved fuel consumption. The front was reworked with larger headlamps and grille opening, accentuated by a single central chrome strip.

The Blenheim 3 which went on sale in 2000 (shown in October 1999) saw the abandonment of the vertically mounted Bedford tail-lights in favor of the split units from the Opel Senator B and a much revised interior layout with completely new gear selector and improved instrumentation. Also, the engine saw significant improvements: higher compression along with reworked camshafts, heads, and a new engine management system gave what Bristol referred to as "significantly increased" power. As of early 2002 there was also a sportier model with blacked out trim, called the Blenheim 3S. Bristol themselves declined to offer official power figures, as usual, but simply stated that the engine provided "muscular authority." The suspension was firmed up and aluminium wheels were fitted. At the rear end, four exhaust pipes were fitted.

In the spring of 2009, Bristol finished a car referred to as the Blenheim 4S/G at the request of a customer. This revived the 603 body, albeit with the taillights of a 2000-2004 Audi A4 Avant (B6), and with new doorhandles replacing the usual Vauxhall units. It is not immediately apparent, but every single body panel is changed, even the roof, as the roof gutters were replaced with more modern, integrated roof gulleys. Series production seems to have been under consideration but the car remains a one-off.

References

External links 
Bristol Owners Club Type 603 pages

603
Cars introduced in 1976
Bristol Type 603
Bristol Type 603
Sedans
Rear-wheel-drive vehicles
Grand tourers
2000s cars
2010s cars